Ryuji Hirota (廣田 隆治, born 16 July 1993) is a Japanese football player who plays for Thai League 1 club Chiangrai United.

Career statistics

Club
Updated to 23 February 2020.

1Includes JFL Relegation Playoffs.

References

External links

Profile at Gainare Tottori
Profile at Renofa Yamaguchi

1993 births
Living people
Association football people from Hyōgo Prefecture
Japanese footballers
J2 League players
J3 League players
Japan Football League players
FC Gifu players
Gainare Tottori players
Renofa Yamaguchi FC players
Iwate Grulla Morioka players
Veertien Mie players
Ryuji Hirota
Association football midfielders